The Daily Courier or Daily Courier is the common name for a number of newspapers, including:
Grants Pass Daily Courier
The Daily Courier (Arizona)
The Daily Courier (Kelowna) in British Columbia
The Daily Courier (North Carolina)
Daily Courier, of Connellsville, Pennsylvania, an edition of the Pittsburgh Tribune-Review